The 1998 Alabama Crimson Tide football team represented the University of Alabama in the college football season of 1998–99. The team's head coach was Mike DuBose, who was entering his second year at Alabama. They played their home games at both Bryant–Denny Stadium in Tuscaloosa and Legion Field in Birmingham, Alabama and competed in the West Division of the Southeastern Conference. They improved upon a 4–7 record from the 1997 season by finishing the 1998 campaign with a 7–5 record and an appearance in the Music City Bowl. The win against Ole Miss during the season marked Alabama's first ever overtime victory.

Schedule

Rankings

Coaching staff

Game summaries

BYU

The Crimson Tide debut a new east side upper deck and 81 new sky boxes in Bryant-Denny Stadium which set the attendance mark to 83,818. This record-breaking crowd watched as Shaun Alexander scored five touchdowns as the Crimson Tide held on to beat BYU.

Vanderbilt

Alabama would score 32 unanswered points after Vanderbilt took a 7–0 lead in the first quarter to win its first conference game of the year. The Alabama defense held Vanderbilt to -33  rushing yards and forced three interceptions. The Alabama offense was led by Shaun Alexander who rushed for 206 yards and three touchdowns.

Arkansas

Despite only trailing by eight at the half, Alabama would be shut out in the second half and lose by 36 points. This would be the largest margin of defeat since the 1957 Iron Bowl.

Florida

Despite being outgained by over 200 yards, Alabama had an opportunity driving at the end of the game to try to win, but a late interception by Andrew Zow gave Florida the win. Florida had 6 possessions inside the Alabama 12 yard line 3 resulting in turnovers, 3 resulting in field goals that kept Alabama in the game.

Ole Miss

A 22-yard game-winning field goal by Ryan Pflugner in overtime gave the Crimson Tide its first overtime victory in its second try. The Rebels, who tied it late in the 4th quarter with a field goal to force overtime, threw an interception on their first possession which put Alabama in a score and win scenario.

East Carolina

Despite having a 21–0 lead at the half, a blocked extra point ran back for two points in the third quarter was the difference in the second half for Alabama. East Carolina outscored Alabama 22–2 in the second half but, never could take the lead away from Alabama.

Tennessee

Tennessee for the 4th year in a row beat Alabama in what was a close game up until Peerless Price ran a 100-yard kickoff return for a touchdown after the Crimson Tide had cut the lead to three. Alabama would not get closer than the ten point lead after that.

Southern Miss

Behind a career-high 361 yards passing from Andrew Zow, the Crimson Tide amassed 499 yards of offense as they beat Southern Miss in their final game at Bryant-Denny Stadium this season.

LSU

The Crimson Tide trailed 16–7 with less than 3 minutes to go in the game when they were able to score a touchdown with 2:24 left making the score 16–14. Alabama would recover an onside kick and drive down the field and with 38 seconds to go in the game Andrew Zow hit Michael Vaughn on a deflected pass in the end zone and with the two point conversion Alabama led 22–16. An interception by Marcus Spencer would seal one of the greatest comebacks in Alabama History. This game was also the first time both teams came into the game not ranked since 1990.

Mississippi State

J.J. Johnson broke a Mississippi State school record for rushing yards in a game at 237 as Mississippi State would win its third straight meeting over Alabama. Despite a 20–0 deficit in the third quarter, Alabama rallied to cut the lead to six but that was as close as they could get.

Auburn

Despite trailing 17–0 in the second quarter, Alabama would score the final 31 points of the game to win the Iron Bowl. Four turnovers for Auburn helped the Crimson Tide get back and eventually pull away from Auburn. This would be the last Iron Bowl ever to be played at Legion Field in Birmingham.

Virginia Tech

The first ever Music City Bowl had an exciting first half with Alabama trailing Virginia Tech 10–7 at the half. The second half was all Virginia Tech as they would outscore the Crimson Tide 28–0 to beat Alabama. The lose would end the Crimson Tide season at 7–5.

References

Alabama
Alabama Crimson Tide football seasons
Alabama Crimson Tide football